The Rio Verde (Verde River) is a river of Mato Grosso state in western Brazil and eastern Bolivia. Before its mouth at the Guaporé River, the Verde forms the border between Brazil and Bolivia, at which point the Guaporé River forms the border.

See also
List of rivers of Mato Grosso

References
Brazilian Ministry of Transport

Rivers of Mato Grosso